The following is a  list of British military equipment of World War II which includes artillery, vehicles and vessels. This also would largely apply to Commonwealth of Nations countries in World War II like Australia, India and South Africa as the majority of their equipment would have been British as they were at that time part of the British Empire. However commonwealth countries did make their own unique weapons like the Owen gun and Vickers–Berthier.

Uniforms/protective equipment 

 Brodie, Mark I, MKl*, and MKll “steel or bowl style helmet” (link above is only for the Brodie helmet) unlike popular belief there is no such thing as a Brodie MKl or Brodie MKll it is only a Brodie helmet, the MKll and Mkl steel helmets are the improved British design of the 1915 Brodie helmet
 Mk III "Turtle" helmet - introduced in 1944
 Helmet Steel Airborne Troop - for airborne forces
Beret - the beret was introduced in place of the Field service cap for some units with specific colours for some units
 Green beret - worn by British Commandos
 Maroon beret - from 1942 by airborne units
 Tan beret - Special Air Service from 1942 till 1944
 Black beret - by armoured units, including the Royal Tank Corps from 1924
 Service Dress - the field uniform at the start of the war until replaced by battledress
 Battledress ("Uniform No. 5")
 1937 Pattern Web Equipment

Knives and bayonets
  Pattern 1907 bayonet
  No. 4 Bayonet
 Sten bayonet mk I-Sten mk II
 No. 5 Bayonet
 No. 7 Bayonet-Sten mk V
 Push dagger
 BC-41
  Fairbairn–Sykes fighting knife
 Smatchet
 Bayonet
 Kukri

Weapons
 List of World War II weapons of the United Kingdom

Vehicles
 British Commonwealth armoured fighting vehicles of World War II
 British armoured fighting vehicle production during World War II
 See also: List of World War II military vehicles by country#United Kingdom

Naval ships
 List of Classes of British ships of World War II
 List of requisitioned trawlers of the Royal Navy (WWII)

Naval equipment 
 List of Royal Navy and other British naval forces military equipment of World War II

Aircraft
 List of aircraft of the United Kingdom in World War II
 Naval aircraft
 List of Fleet Air Arm aircraft in World War II
 Equipment of RAF bombers
 List of equipment of RAF Bomber Command aircraft of World War II

Radar
 Ground
 Chain Home, early warning radar
 Chain Home Low
 AMES Type 7
 GL Mk. I radar, gun laying radar for anti-aircraft batteries
 GL Mk. III radar, gun laying radar for anti-aircraft batteries
 Aircraft
 Monica (radar), tail warning radar fitted to bombers
 H2S (radar), ground scanning radar fitted to bombers
 AI Mk. IV radar, airborne interception radar fitted to fighters
 AI Mk. VIII radar, airborne interception radar fitted to fighters
 ASV Mark II radar
 ASV Mark III radar
 Naval
 List of World War II British naval radar

Missiles and bombs

Aerial bombs

Cartridges and shells

 .303 British for standard issue rifles and light machine guns
 .38 S&W for standard issue revolvers
 9×19mm Parabellum for standard issue submachine guns

See also
 List of equipment used in World War II
 List of common World War II infantry weapons
 List of secondary and special-issue World War II infantry weapons

References

 
British World War II
United Kingdom in World War II-related lists
.
World War II
World War II Equipment
World War II Equipment